Berosus is a lunar impact crater that is located in the northeast part of the Moon, less than one crater diameter northwest of Hahn. Further to the east-northeast is the large crater Gauss, and to the north-northwest lies Bernoulli. Because of its location, this crater appears foreshortened when viewed from the Earth.

The rim of this crater is roughly circular, but with some angularity along the eastern edge. The southern end of the crater has been heavily eroded, and there are some tiny craterlets along the northern rim. The inner walls have some terracing along the east and northwestern sides. The interior floor of Berosus has been flooded by lava, and so is level and nearly featureless.

Satellite craters
By convention these features are identified on lunar maps by placing the letter on the side of the crater midpoint that is closest to Berosus.

References

 
 
 
 
 
 
 
 
 
 
 
 

Impact craters on the Moon